The Vues des ports de France ("Scenes of the harbours of France") are a series of paintings by French painter Joseph Vernet, made between 1754 and 1765 to answer a requirement by King Louis XV. Representing ten harbours, they were meant to document and promote commerce and naval service.

History 
In 1753, Abel-François Poisson de Vandières suggested to King Louis XV that Vernet realise a series of paintings documenting and exalting the harbours of France. The Crown ordered 24 paintings, each paid 6000 Livres tournois, with detailed specifications, such as the foreground representing the activities of the local industry.

Between 1753 and 1765, Vernet traveled to ten of the harbours (Marseille, Bandol, Toulon, Antibes, Sète, Bordeaux, Bayonne, La Rochelle, Rochefort and Dieppe), and eventually completed 15 of the intended 24 views. The paintings were exposed at the Salon de peinture et de sculpture, with long descriptions detailing their technical aspects. From 1758, engraved reproductions of the paintings were made by Charles-Nicolas Cochin and Jacques-Philippe Le Bas and published; they proved popular and were reprinted several times.

The series consolidated Vernet's status as a marine painter, and from then on his paintings were highly priced, "worth their weigh in gold" according to Pierre-Jean Mariette, with patrons such as Catherine II of Russia.

Legacy 
In 1791,  Jean-François Hue, himself a student of Vernet's, was tasked to complete the series. Between 1792 and 1798, he completed six paintings representing harbours of Bretagne, known as the Vues des ports de Bretagne. In 1793, the Ports de France were amongst the first works exposed at the "Central Museum of Arts", which would become the Louvre Museum.

In 1943, the State Secretary of the Navy requested that the paintings be attached to the Musée national de la Marine; thirteen of the paintings ended up transferring, while the last two remained at the Louvre. The paintings were all shown together in 1976.

Paintings 
All of the paintings are oil on canvas, with the same dimensions of 165 by 263 cm.

Notes, citations, and references

Notes

Citations

References

 Ports de France, Joseph Vernet, musée national de la Marine

History of the French Navy
Painting series
1750s paintings
1760s paintings
Maritime paintings